Fauna of Kazakhstan may refer to:

 List of birds of Kazakhstan
 List of mammals of Kazakhstan

See also
 Outline of Kazakhstan